Michael Koch (born 27 September 1969) is a German former professional footballer who played as a midfielder.

References

1969 births
Living people
German footballers
Association football midfielders
Altonaer FC von 1893 players
Hamburger SV players
Hannover 96 players
Stuttgarter Kickers players
VfB Lübeck players
2. Bundesliga players
Footballers from Hamburg
West German footballers